The Brague is a river in the département of Alpes-Maritimes and the région of Provence-Alpes-Côte d'Azur in France. The Brague takes its source near Châteauneuf-Grasse and ends in the Mediterranean Sea near Antibes.

Part of the Brague Valley is covered by a park called the "Parc Départemental de la Brague".

References

Rivers of France
Rivers of Alpes-Maritimes
Rivers of Provence-Alpes-Côte d'Azur
0Brague